Lottie Phiri (born 3 November 1988 in Lusaka) is a Zambian footballer who plays as a striker. He played in the Zambian Premier League,Southafriacn league ( absa )and the Zambia national football team.

References

1988 births
Living people
Zambian footballers
Zambia international footballers
Association football midfielders
Young Arrows F.C. players
ZESCO United F.C. players
Mpumalanga Black Aces F.C. players
Power Dynamos F.C. players
Green Buffaloes F.C. players
NAPSA Stars F.C. players
Zambian expatriate footballers
Expatriate soccer players in South Africa
Zambian expatriate sportspeople in South Africa